The Australia Davis Cup team is the second most successful team ever to compete in the Davis Cup, winning the coveted title on 28 separate occasions, second behind the United States with 32.

Australia also participated in winning the Davis Cup six times with New Zealand under the alias Australasia (1905–1922).

History

Australasia: 1905–1922

While Australia and New Zealand have been two separate countries, the two countries did compete together under the alias Australasia in a number of sports, including Davis Cup in the first couple of decades of the 20th century.

Australian players began playing Davis Cup tennis in 1905 as a part of the Australasia Davis Cup team, which allowed players from New Zealand to compete on the same team. Despite players from New Zealand being eligible to represent Australasia, Anthony Wilding was the only New Zealander to play for the team while it existed.

During this period, the team won the Davis Cup on six occasions in 1907, 1908, 1909, 1911, 1914 and 1919.

In 1920, Australasia lost in the Challenge Round to the United States Davis Cup team 0–5 at home in Auckland. The team then reached the final in 1921 before again making the Challenge Round in 1922. The team lost 1–4 against the United States, away in New York City. This was the last ever tournament under the Australasia moniker before the nations began competing as separate entities.

The fledgling years: 1923–1937
In the first tournament as the stand alone Australia team, the side reached the Challenge Round, again losing 1–4 to the United States in New York City. The following year, Australia beat Japan 5–0 in the America Zone to qualify for the Inter-zonal final, where they defeated France 3–2 to set up another Challenge Round rematch against the USA for the third consecutive year. Unfortunately it wasn't meant to be for Australia, this time losing 0–5 in Philadelphia. France were able to enact revenge in 1925 when they defeated Australia 3–1 in the inter-zonal final.

The following few years would prove to be a lean spell for Australia, as they were either absent from the competition or were knocked out in the early rounds until they returned to form in 1933. Beginning the tournament from the second round of the Europe Zone, they won three ties before losing to eventual champions, Great Britain in the Europe Zone final. They went one round further in 1934, losing 2–3 to the United States in the inter-zonal final. In 1936, Australia won three ties to set up a Challenge Round Final against Great Britain. Great Britain made use of the home ground advantage, winning 3–2 at the All England club in Wimbledon, London. 1937 would see Australia lose 0–5 in the America Zone final to eventual champions, United States. However this would spark a period of significant dominance for Australia.

Dominance

From 1937 to 1973, the only teams to win the Davis Cup were Australia and the U.S., in which 31 times were between one another. Australia won the Davis Cup title 17 times in 1939, 1950, 1951, 1952, 1953, 1955, 1956, 1957, 1959, 1960, 1961, 1962, 1964, 1965, 1966, 1967, and 1973.

Between 1938 and 1968, Australia participated in the Challenge Round for a consecutive 25 years, winning 16 titles and losing 9 times. This streak included earning the record for most consecutive titles with four. This accomplishment was achieved on three separate occasions, between 1950 to 1953, 1959 to 1962 and 1964 to 1967. Australia also recorded three consecutive titles between 1955 to 1957.
   
The only decades that Australia didn't win the Davis Cup was in the 1920s, 1940s and 2010s. Australia was runner up eight times during the 1920s and 1940s.

After the 1973 victory, Australia won the title another five times: 1977, 1983, 1986, 1999 and 2003. From 1999 to 2003, Australia reached the final round four times and won in 1999 and 2003.

2000 to 2009
In 2003, Lleyton Hewitt came back from two sets to love down against Roger Federer of Switzerland to win in five sets in the fourth rubber to clinch a Davis Cup final berth. In the final, Australia defeated Spain 3–1 in Melbourne Park in which Mark Philippoussis, with a torn pectoral muscle, defeated Juan Carlos Ferrero in five sets.

After Australia's 2003 win over Spain, Australia lost in the 2004 Davis Cup; Sweden beat Australia 4–1. Australia then had to play a world group qualifying match against Morocco, which it won 4–1. Australia solidified its spot in the 2005 Davis Cup world group and breezed through its first round against Austria 5–0. Argentina beat Australia in the next round.

In 2006, Australia managed to defeat Switzerland 3–2 in the fifth rubber in the first round. Australia then beat Belarus statement a 5–0 victory. Australia suffered a 5–0 loss to Argentina in the semifinals.

In the 2007 Davis Cup, Australia lost its first tie against Belgium, putting Australia in the world group playoffs. Australia drew Serbia in Serbia for a world group playoff, and Serbia won 4–1 overall.

The 2008 Davis Cup saw Australia beat Chinese Taipei 4–1 and Thailand 5–0. Australia then advanced to the world group playoffs, where it lost to Chile 3–2.

In the 2009 Davis Cup, Australia beat Thailand 3–2, and the team was drawn to against India in Chennai. Australia refused to play the tie in India for security concerns, so India advanced to the world group playoffs via forfeit.

2010's
In the 2010 Davis Cup, Australia easily advanced through the Asia/Oceania playoffs with 5–0 defeats of Chinese Taipei and Japan. Australia then played a home tie against Belgium, losing 3–2.

For the fourth year in a row, Australia started its 2011 Davis Cup campaign in the Asia/Oceania playoffs. Australia then advanced to the 2011 Davis Cup World Group Play-offs, where it received a home tie against seeded Switzerland. Played on grass at the Royal Sydney Golf Club in Sydney, Australia, Australia lost to Switzerland 3–2.

Australia began its 2012 Davis Cup again in the Asia/Oceania playoffs. Australia easily beat for China in the first round with a 5–0 victory and South Korea in the semifinals with a 5–0 win. Australia faced Germany in Hamburg, losing the tie 3–2.

Rivalries

Australia and the United States
Having both teams dominate the competition for 36 years, Australia and the United States have had an intense rivalry in Davis Cup.
They have played each other in the Davis Cup final on 29 separate occasions, with Australia leading the head-to-head 15–14. The first Davis Cup final meeting was in 1908 in which Australia triumphed 3–2. In fact, Australia won the first three Davis Cup final ties between the two, in the aforementioned 1908, 1909 and 1911. The final Davis Cup meeting between the pair was in 1990, in which the U.S. won 3–1.

In recent years, the rivalry has waned, while the two teams had not played each other from 1999 to 2016, when Australia hosted the U.S. in Round 1 of the 2016 Cup. The two teams met again in the second round of the 2017 Davis Cup, which extended their total meetings to 47. As of the completion of the 2017 meeting, the ledger stands at 26–21 in favour of the U.S.

Recent performances

2020–21 Davis Cup — Group Stage. 
Australia qualified for the Davis Cup Finals but did not advance past the group stage. They finished with an overall match record of 2–1.

2022 Davis Cup — Finalist. 
Australia finished as Davis Cup finalists for the twentieth time. They finished with an overall match record of 5–2.

Players

Current squad 
Player information and rankings

Captains
There have been 19 Davis Cup captains since Australia's first participation in the event in 1905 (as Australasia).

Notes

Individual and team records

Most appearances and wins

Performance timeline

Record

Home and away record (since 1981; all 102 match-ups) 

Performance at home (50 match-ups): 41–9 (82.2%)
Performance away (52 match-ups): 29–23 (55.5%)
Total: 69–31 (68.8%)

Head-to-head record 

Notes

Record against continents (since 1981)

Record by decade

Results

Key to eras and positions result 
 Challenge Round era (1905–1971): The previous Davis Cup Champion would have a bye to and host the Challenge Round Final. Thus the losing team in the Final (or Inter-zonal final) was the third-placed team. For the purposes of this table, the third placed team is grouped as semifinalists and the Zonal finalists (fourth and fifth placed teams) are grouped as quarterfinalists.
 1972–1980: The previous Davis Cup Champion now had to compete in all rounds. There were four zones consisting of America, Eastern, Europe A and Europe B, with the competition culminating in a four team knockout between zonal winners. The zonal finalists were the equivalent of Davis Cup quarterfinalists.
 Since 1981: World Group (1981–2018), Davis Cup Finals (from 2019) consisting of 16 or 18 teams.
 Abbreviations: POW = Winner of World Group Playoff (1981–2018); POL = Lost in World Group Playoff (1981–2018); GS = Did not advance past the Group Stage of the Davis Cup Finals (from 2019); GI SF = Asia/Oceania Group I Semifinalists (1981–2018)

Results table

Notes 

List of Australia Davis Cup team representatives
List of Australia Davis Cup team results

References

External links

Davis Cup teams
Davis